Serghei Tarnovschi (born 24 June 1997) is a Moldovan-Ukrainian canoeist. He competed at the 2020 Summer Olympics, in Men's C-1 1000 m, winning a bronze medal.

Career

Tarnovschi represented Moldova at the 2016 Summer Olympics, where he was awarded a bronze medal at Men's C-1 1000 metres. It was subsequently stripped from him due to doping, as on 18 August 2016, he was suspended after failing doping test.

On 30 November 2016, Tarnovschi's lawyer Paul J. Greene, admitted that a prohibited substance was in fact found in the athlete's urine sample, claiming that "the substance could not produce any effect".

On 19 August 2016, in a press release, the Olympic Committee of Moldova stated that the prohibited substance in Tarnovschi's urine sample was the Growth Hormone Releasing Peptide.

In an article from 3 November 2016, a Moldova news agency Unimedia stated that the B sample of Tarnovschi's urine also tested positive for GHRP 2. On the same day the MOLDPRES news agency stated that Tarnovschi's Olympic bronze medal will be stripped, and the prize money (2 million MDL) will be withheld until the International Canoe Federation's final decision in his case. ICF held an annual conference on 27 November 2016, in Baku, Azerbaijan, where on 30 November the deliberations in Tarnovschi's doping case took place. According to Moldova National Olympic Committee, the decision was to be made public "in a few weeks".

In an 14 October 2016 interview to a Russian canoe portal canoesport.ru, the president of the Moldova Olympic Committee, Nicolae Juravschi, stated that "It seems that the great powers are clearing the road to the medals for their athletes". English version of the text can be found on the Sportscene's Facebook page here 

In a press release from 3 February 2017, the International Canoe Federation announced that Tarnovschi was found guilty, and disqualified for 4 years under Section 2.1 of ICF Anti-Doping Rules, effective from the date that the positive urine sample was obtained on 8 July 2016, and that all results, points, and awards after that date deemed invalid. By consequence, Tarnovshi's bronze Olympic medal will be stripped and passed on Ilia Shtokalov, a Russian athlete who came in 4th in the C1 1000m race in Rio Olympics 2016.

References

External links

1997 births
Living people
Ukrainian male canoeists
Moldovan male canoeists
Canoeists at the 2016 Summer Olympics
Olympic canoeists of Moldova
Naturalised citizens of Moldova
Ukrainian emigrants to Moldova
Canoeists at the 2014 Summer Youth Olympics
Doping cases in canoeing
Moldovan sportspeople in doping cases
Competitors stripped of Summer Olympics medals
Youth Olympic gold medalists for Moldova
Canoeists at the 2020 Summer Olympics
Medalists at the 2020 Summer Olympics
Olympic medalists in canoeing
Olympic bronze medalists for Moldova